Rendezvous in July is a 1949 French comedy film directed and written by Jacques Becker. It was entered into the 1949 Cannes Film Festival. The film was selected for screening as part of the Cannes Classics section at the 2016 Cannes Film Festival. It had its New York premiere in 2018. The New York Times said it was "superabundant in charm, wit and soul".

Cast
 Daniel Gélin as Lucien
 Brigitte Auber as Thérèse
 Nicole Courcel as Christine Courcel
 Pierre Trabaud as Pierrot
 Maurice Ronet as Roger
 Philippe Mareuil as François
 Henri Belly
 Jacques Fabbri
 Michel Barbey
 Francis Maziére as Frédéric
 Robert Lombard
 Jean Pommier
 María Riquelme
 Annie Noël
 Pierre Mondy
 Claude Luter as Chef orchestre

Jazz cornetist Rex Stewart makes a cameo appearance as well.

References

External links

1949 films
1949 comedy films
French black-and-white films
Films directed by Jacques Becker
French comedy films
Louis Delluc Prize winners
French coming-of-age comedy films
1940s French-language films
1940s French films